The Ukrainian National Road Race Championships have been held since 1992.

Men

Elite

U23

Women

See also
Ukrainian National Time Trial Championships
National road cycling championships

References

National road cycling championships
Recurring sporting events established in 1992
1992 establishments in Ukraine
Cycle races in Ukraine
Road race